Giang Thành is a rural district of the Mekong Delta region of Vietnam. It was established in 2009 from 5 communes in northern Kiên Lương district. As of 2009 the district had a population of 28,910. The district covers an area of 407.443 km². The capital of the district is under construction.

Communes
The district is divided into 5 communes:
Phú Lợi
Phú Mỹ
Tân Khánh Hòa (considered as the district seat)
Vĩnh Điều
Vĩnh Phú

References

Districts of Kiên Giang province